Gerolstein is a Verbandsgemeinde ("collective municipality") in the district Vulkaneifel, in Rhineland-Palatinate, Germany. The seat of the Verbandsgemeinde is in Gerolstein. On 1 January 2019 it was expanded with the municipalities of the former Verbandsgemeinden Hillesheim and Obere Kyll.

The Verbandsgemeinde Gerolstein consists of the following Ortsgemeinden ("local municipalities"):

Basberg 
Berlingen 
Berndorf 
Birgel 
Birresborn 
Densborn 
Dohm-Lammersdorf 
Duppach 
Esch 
Feusdorf 
Gerolstein
Gönnersdorf 
Hallschlag
Hillesheim
Hohenfels-Essingen 
Jünkerath
Kalenborn-Scheuern 
Kerpen 
Kerschenbach
Kopp 
Lissendorf 
Mürlenbach 
Neroth
Nohn 
Oberbettingen 
Oberehe-Stroheich 
Ormont 
Pelm 
Reuth 
Rockeskyll 
Salm 
Scheid 
Schüller 
Stadtkyll 
Steffeln 
Üxheim 
Walsdorf 
Wiesbaum

Verbandsgemeinde in Rhineland-Palatinate